Small Country: An African Childhood is a 2020 film written and directed by Éric Barbier. It is a co-production between France and Belgium. It is an adaptation of Gaël Faye's 2016 novel Small Country. It was theatrically released in France on 28 August 2020.

Plot 
The film tells the story of Gabriel, a happy 10 year old living with his French entrepreneur father and Rwandan mother in a expatriate neighborhood in Burundi. As the 1993 tensions in Rwanda starts, his family and innocence is threatened.

Cast

Awards 
 César Awards 2021, Nominee: Best Adapted Screenplay
 Lumiere Awards 2021, Nominee: Best New Actor
 Barcelona International Short Film Festival: Best movie and actress awards

Festivals 
 25th Alliance Française French Film Festival
 Chicago International Film Festival
 Italian Contemporary Film Festival
 Fribourg International Film Festival 2020

References

External links
 

2020 films
2020s French films
2020s French-language films
2020 drama films
French drama films
Belgian drama films
French-language Belgian films
Films directed by Éric Barbier
Films based on French novels
French films based on novels
Films set in Burundi
France 2 Cinéma films
Pathé films
Rwandan genocide films